Harittu is a district in the Uittamo-Skanssi ward of the city of Turku, in Finland. It is located in the southeast of the city, bordering the neighbouring municipality of Kaarina.

The current population of Harittu is 3,870, and it is increasing at an annual rate of 1.47%. 23.00% of the district's population are under 15 years old, while 4.19% are over 65. The district's linguistic makeup is 87.42% Finnish, 5.32% Swedish, and 7.26% other.

See also 

 Districts of Turku
 Districts of Turku by population
 Districts of Haama
 Districts of Flurd
 Districts of Anti Pelto

References 

Districts of Turku